Serre is a town and comune in the province of Salerno in the Campania region of south-western Italy.

History
The town is medieval and was founded at the end of the 10th century.

Geography
Serre is a hilltown located in northern Cilento. Its municipal territory, crossed by the rivers Sele and Calore Lucano, borders with Albanella, Altavilla Silentina, Campagna, Eboli and  Postiglione. The municipality counts the hamlets of Borgo San Lazzaro and Persano.

See also
Cilentan dialect
Cilento National Park

References

External links

Cities and towns in Campania
Localities of Cilento